Jeremiah Wahome (born 14 December 1998 in Nairobi) is a racing driver from Kenya. He has competed in various open-wheel formulae, including the BRDC British Formula 3 Championship and F3 Asian Championship.

Racing record

Career summary

Complete F3 Asian Championship results
(key) (Races in bold indicate pole position) (Races in italics indicate fastest lap)

Complete World Rally Championship results

References

External links

 Profile at Driver Database

Kenyan racing drivers
1998 births
Living people
BRDC British Formula 3 Championship drivers
Sportspeople from Nairobi
F3 Asian Championship drivers
Kenyan rally drivers
World Rally Championship drivers
Team Meritus drivers
Chris Dittmann Racing drivers